Gibberula mapipi is a species of sea snail, a marine gastropod mollusk, in the family Cystiscidae.

Distribution
This species occurs in Martinique.

References

mapipi
Gastropods described in 2017
Cystiscidae